Cisna  (Tisna) is the main village of the Gmina Cisna in the Lesko County, in the Subcarpathian Voivodeship (province) of south-eastern Poland. It lies in the Solinka valley in between the Bieszczady mountains.

History

The village was founded in 1552 by the Bals family.

Jacek Fredro founded a blacksmith company in Cisna that provided the area with agricultural instruments, pots and stoves. His son Aleksander Fredro, a famous Polish poet, playwright and writer, was born there.

In the years between 1890 and 1895, a narrow gauge railroad was built to Nowy Łupków and in 1904 extended to Kalnica. In the interbellum, Cisna was one of the principal villages in the Bieszczady and was a well-known place to spend a holiday, growing to 60,000 inhabitants.

The Second World War destroyed almost all of the village. Afterwards, between 1945 and 1947, fighting continued in the area between Polish and Soviet armies and the Ukrainian Insurgent Army. The village was burned in 1946 and all villagers were forcibly deported to the USSR. Some people were deported from Cisna on 29 April 1947 (Operation Vistula) to the Gdańsk area of Poland.

Population
1921 - 166 Poles, 132 Ukrainians,  118 Jews
2006 - 410 Poles

Hiking trails
 European walking route E8
 Prešov - Miháľov - Kurimka - Dukla - Iwonicz-Zdrój – Rymanów-Zdrój - Puławy – Tokarnia – Kamień – Komańcza - Cisna - Ustrzyki Górne - Tarnica - Wołosate.

See also
Komancza Republic (November 1918 – January 1919)

References

Villages in Lesko County
Populated places established in 1552
1552 establishments in Europe
16th-century establishments in Poland